James Bailey (died 1864) was an English classical scholar and schoolmaster.

Life
He was educated at Trinity College, Cambridge. He graduated B.A. 1814, M.A. 1823, and obtained the Browne medals for Greek ode and epigrams, and the members' prizes in 1815 and 1816. He was for many years master of the Perse Grammar School, Cambridge, from which he retired on a pension.

In 1850 he received a further pension of £100 per annum from the queen, on the recommendation of Bishops Edward Maltby and John Kaye. Bailey died in London, 13 February 1864.

Works
Besides  contributions to the Classical Journal, Bailey published:

 'An Annotated Edition of Dalzel's Analecta Græca Minora' (1835) (edition of work by Andrew Dalzel).
 'Passages from the Greek Comic Poets,' which had been translated into English by Richard Cumberland, Francis Fawkes, and Francis Wrangham, with notes (1840); 
 a work on the 'Origin and Nature of Hieroglyphics and the Greek inscription on the Rosetta Stone' (1816).

He is best known for his edition of 'Forcellini's Latin Dictionary,' 2 vols. (1826), in which he translated the Italian explanations into English, incorporated the appendices of Egidio Forcellini with the main work, and added an Auctarium of his own.

References

Notes

Attribution

Year of birth missing
1864 deaths
Alumni of Trinity College, Cambridge
English classical scholars
English male writers